Samiha Mohsen (born 1998) is an Egyptian swimmer.

Career 
At the 2018 African Swimming Championships in Algiers, Algeria, Samiha won the following medals:

Personal life 
Born in Egypt, Samiha moved to the United States in 2015 to complete a Bachelor's degree in biology pre-medicine, interning at the Mayo Clinic upon graduation. She now resides in Calgary, Canada, pursuing a Masters in epidemiology at the University of Calgary where she is part of the university's swim varsity team.

References

External links 
 Swimrankings

Egyptian female swimmers
1998 births
Living people
20th-century Egyptian women
21st-century Egyptian women
Female backstroke swimmers
Egyptian female freestyle swimmers